Stony Creek was a railway station on the South Gippsland line in South Gippsland, Victoria. The station was opened during the 1890s and operated until the 1970s. The line was closed in 1991 and turned into the Great Southern Rail Trail.

Disused railway stations in Victoria (Australia)
Transport in Gippsland (region)
Shire of South Gippsland